The 2018 season was Penn FC's 15th season of competitive soccer, its second in the second division of American soccer, and its eighth and final season in the United Soccer League, now known as the USL Championship. This was the first season the club operated under the "Penn FC" name, having re-branded from the Harrisburg City Islanders in November 2017.

In October 2018, the club announced that it would not play in the USL's top flight beyond that season. Penn FC will suspend professional operations for the 2019 season and resume play in 2020 as a member of USL League One, a third-level league to be launched in 2019 by the USL parent organization.

Review

Roster

Transfers

In

Out

Competitions

Preseason

USL
The 2018 USL season will be contested by 33 teams, 16 of which compete in the league's Eastern Conference. All teams will play a regular season total of 34 matches between teams within their respective conference. At the conclusion of the regular season, the top eight teams from each conference advance to the 2018 USL Playoffs for a chance to compete for the USL Championship Title.

Standings (Eastern Conference)

Results
All times in Eastern Time.

Results summary

U.S. Open Cup

Statistics

Appearances and goals

|-
|colspan="12"|Defenders:
|-

|-
|colspan="12"|Midfielders:
|-

|-
|colspan="12"|Forwards:
|-

|}
Italics indicates player left team midway through season.

Goalkeepers

League Stats 

Record: W-L-D

U.S. Open Cup Stats 

Record: W-L-D

Honors
 Week 3 Team of the Week Bench: D Ken Tribbett
 Week 6 Team of the Week: D Ken Tribbett
 Week 7 Team of the Week Bench: D Sean Lewis
 Week 8 Player of the Week: F Tommy Heinemann
 Week 11 Team of the Week: G Romuald Peiser
 Week 13 Team of the Week: D Ken Tribbett
 Week 14 Team of the Week Bench: F Lucky Mkosana
 Week 15 Team of the Week: F Lucky Mkosana
 Week 17 Team of the Week: F Lucky Mkosana
 Week 25 Team of the Week Bench: F Aaron Dennis
 Week 27 Team of the Week Bench: D Kyle Venter
 Week 30 Team of the Week Bench: M Richard Menjívar

References

Penn FC
Penn FC
Penn FC seasons
Penn FC